Palausybra vestigialis is a species of beetle in the family Cerambycidae, and the only species in the genus Palausybra. It was described by Gressitt in 1956.

References

Apomecynini
Beetles described in 1956
Monotypic beetle genera